Cristián Paul Arano Ruiz (born 23 February 1995) is a Bolivian footballer who plays for Club Blooming.

Career
Arano made his first division debut for Club Blooming in a 3–0 home victory over Nacional Potosí on March 13, 2014. He scored his first goal with Blooming on August 9, 2015 in a 1-1 draw against The Strongest at Estadio Hernando Siles.

International career
Arano made his full international debut for the Bolivia national football team on the 13 October 2018 against Myanmar a 3-0 victory at the Thuwanna YTC Stadium.

References

Living people
1995 births
Bolivian footballers
Club Blooming players
Association football midfielders